Brindabellaspis stensioi ("Erik Stensiö's Brindabella Ranges Shield") is a placoderm with a flat, platypus-like snout from the Early Devonian of the Taemas-Wee Jasper reef in Australia. When it was first discovered in 1980, it was originally regarded as a Weejasperaspid acanthothoracid due to anatomical similarities with the other species found at the reef.

According to Philippe Janvier, anatomical similarities of B. stensiois brain and braincase with those of jawless fish, such as the Osteostraci and the Galeaspida, strongly suggest that B. stensioi, and also the antiarchs, are basal placoderms closest to the ancestral placoderm.

References

Young, Gavin C. 1980, A new Early Devonian placoderm from New South Wales, Australia, with a discussion of placoderm phylogeny: Palaeontographica 167A pp. 10–76. 2 pl., 27 fig.
 Janvier, Philippe. Early Vertebrates Oxford, New York: Oxford University Press, 1998. 
 Long, John A. The Rise of Fishes: 500 Million Years of Evolution' Baltimore: The Johns Hopkins University Press, 1996.

External links
 Palaeos article on B. stensioi 

Placoderm genera
Early Devonian fish
Devonian placoderms
Placoderms of Australia